Langfjordjøkelen is a glacier that is located in Troms og Finnmark county in Norway, making it one of the northernmost glaciers on the mainland of Norway. The  glacier is located on the border of Loppa Municipality and Kvænangen Municipality.

The glacier is currently being studied by glaciologists as the snout is retreating faster than any other glacier in Europe.

References

External links

Glaciers of Troms og Finnmark
Loppa
Kvænangen